Hibbertia simulans is a species of flowering plant in the family Dilleniaceae and is endemic to New South Wales. It is a much-branched shrub with softly-hairy foliage, linear leaves and yellow flowers with eight to ten stamens on one side of two hairy carpels.

Description
The five sepal are joined at the base, the outer lobes slightly longer but narrower than the inner ones. Flowering mostly occurs from September to November.

Taxonomy
Hibbertia simulans was first formally described in 2000 by Hellmut R. Toelken in the Journal of the Adelaide Botanic Gardens from specimens collected by Ernest Francis Constable collected on Mount Costigan (near Tuena, New South Wales). The specific epithet (simulans) means "resembling", referring to a similarity to "forms in the H. stricta complex".

Distribution and habitat
This hibbertia grows in scrub vegetation on mountain tips and wetter areas of central and southern New South Wales.

See also
List of Hibbertia species

References

simulans
Flora of New South Wales
Plants described in 2000
Taxa named by Hellmut R. Toelken